André Filipe Silva Pinto (born 29 April 1994 in Árvore - Vila do Conde) is a Portuguese footballer who plays for Juventude de Pedras Salgadas, as a midfielder.

Club career
On 31 July 2016, Pinto made his professional debut with Vizela in a 2016–17 Taça da Liga match against Fafe.

References

External links

Stats and profile at LPFP 

1994 births
Living people
Portuguese footballers
Association football midfielders
Liga Portugal 2 players
Segunda Divisão players
F.C. Vizela players
SC Mirandela players
C.D. Trofense players
Merelinense F.C. players
Juventude de Pedras Salgadas players
People from Vila do Conde
Sportspeople from Porto District